This is the discography for American rock duo Jan and Dean.

Albums

Studio albums 
{| class="wikitable plainrowheaders" style="text-align:center;"
! rowspan="2" |Title
! rowspan="2" |Album details
! colspan="2" |Peak chart positions
|-
! style="width:3em;font-size:85%" | US<ref name="Billboard 200">Billboard 200 chart positions:

 Jan & Dean Take Linda Surfin''': 
 Surf City (and Other Swingin' Cities): 
 Drag City: 
 Dead Man's Curve / The New Girl in School: 
 Ride the Wild Surf: 
 The Little Old Lady From Pasadena: 
 Command Performance - Live in Person: 
 Jan & Dean Golden Hits Volume 2: 
 Folk 'N Roll: 
 Filet of Soul: 
</ref>
! style="width:3em;font-size:85%" | US
|-
! scope="row" |The Jan & Dean Sound|
 Released: March 1960
 Label: Doré 
|—
|—
|-
! scope="row" |Jan & Dean Take Linda Surfin|
 Released: April 1963
 Label: Liberty 
|92
|—
|-
! scope="row" |Surf City (and Other Swingin' Cities)|
 Released: July 1963
 Label: Liberty 
|32
|21
|-
! scope="row" |Drag City|
 Released: November 1963
 Label: Liberty 
|22 
|17
|-
! scope="row" |Dead Man's Curve / The New Girl In School|
 Released: April 1964
 Label: Liberty 
|80
|42
|-
! scope="row" |Ride the Wild Surf|
 Released: August 1964
 Label: Liberty 
|66
|26
|-
! scope="row" |The Little Old Lady from Pasadena|
 Released: September 1964
 Label: Liberty 
|40
|40
|-
! scope="row" |Jan & Dean's Pop Symphony No. 1 (in 12 Hit Movements)(Performed by The Bel-Aire Pops Orchestra)
|
 Released: May 1965
 Label: Liberty 
| —
| —
|-
! scope="row" |Folk 'n Roll|
 Released: November 1965
 Label: Liberty 
|145
|87
|-
! scope="row" |Jan & Dean Meet Batman|
 Released: March 1966
 Label: Liberty 
| —
| —
|-
! scope="row" |Filet of Soul - A "Live" One|
 Released: April 1966
 Label: Liberty 
|127
| —
|-
! scope="row" |Popsicle|
 Released: June 1966
 Label: Liberty 
| —
| —
|-
! scope="row" |Save for a Rainy Day|
 Cancelled 1966 album
 Released: 1996 by Sundazed 
| —
| —
|-
! scope="row" |Carnival of Sound|
 Cancelled 1968 album
 Released: 2010 by Rhino 
| —
| —
|-
! scope="row" |Port to Paradise|
 Released: 1986
 Label: J&D Records 
| —
| —
|-
! scope="row" |Filet Of Soul Redux: The Rejected Master Recordings|
 Released: 2017
 Label: Omnivore Recordings 
| —
| —
|-
|}

 Live albums 

 Select compilation albums 

Solo albums
Jan Berry album
 Second Wave—One Way 34524 (1997)A Memorial edition of this CD was released in April 2004, after Jan's death

Dean Torrence solo projects
 Rock 'N' Roll City—Realistic – 51-3009 (1983) Released for Radio Shack as "Mike & Dean" for Mike Love from the Beach Boys and Dean Torrence from Jan & Dean
 Anthology: Legendary Masked Surfer Unmasked—Varèse Sarabande 3020663492 (2002)
 The Bamboo Trading Company - From Kitty Hawk To Surf City—Steelsurf 10221 (2013)
 The Teammates''— Omnivore (2022)

Singles
Jan & Arnie singles

Jan & Dean singles

Solo singles
Jan Berry singles
 "Tomorrow's Teardrops"/"My Midsummer Night's Dream"—Ripple 6101 (1960)Shown as "Jan Barry"
 "Universal Coward"/"I Can't Wait To Love You"—Liberty 55845 (1965)Both tracks from the Jan & Dean album Folk 'n Roll (all other tracks from this list are non-album)
 "Mother Earth"/"Blue Moon Shuffle"—Ode 66023 (1972)Jan's first post-accident lead vocal release
 "Blue Moon Shuffle"/"Don't You Just Know It"—Ode 66034 (1973)
 "Tinsel Town (Hitch-a-Ride to Hollywood"/"Blow Up Music"—Ode 66050 (1974)
 "Sing Sang a Song"/"Sing Sang a Song" (Singalong version) -- Ode 66120 (1976)
 "Little Queenie"/"That's the Way It Is"—A&M 1957 (1977)
 "Skateboard Surfin' USA"/"How-How I Love Her"—A&M 2020 (1978)
 "Rock City"/"Its Gotta Be True"—JB (cassette single) (1984)

Dean Torrence related singles
"Summertime, Summertime"/"Theme from Leon's Garage"—Brer Bird 001 (1965)Released as "Our Gang" featuring Dean and Gary Zekley
"Da Doo Ron Ron"/"Baby Talk"—Hitbound Records – HR-101A  (1982)Released as Mike & Dean. Recorded by Mike Love and Dean Torrence (Mike & Dean) Single form their Radio Shack LP album Rock 'N' Roll City.
 The Bamboo Trading Company digital EP — "Shrewd Awakening" [lead vocal with Katie & Jillian Torrence]/"Tonga Hut" [intro and backing vocal] (January 21, 2014) 
 The Bamboo Trading Company digital EP — "Star Of The Beach" [lead vocal]/"Drinkin' In The Sunshine" [backing vocal]/"Tweet (Don't Talk Anymore)" [lead vocal] (July 4, 2014)

Reissues
Liberty All-Time Hit Series reissues
 "Surf City" / "Honolulu Lulu"—54534
 "Dead Man's Curve" / "Drag City"—54544
 "The Little Old Lady From Pasadena" / "The New Girl In School"—54546
 "You Really Know How To Hurt A Guy" / "It's As Easy As 1,2,3"—54549
 "Batman" / "Popsicle"—54554

United Artists Silver Spotlight Series reissues
All released January 1973
 "Jennie Lee" / "Baby Talk"—XW089A-side is a re-recorded version of the Jan & Arnie hit, featured on Jan & Dean's Golden Hits
 "Surf City" / "Ride The Wild Surf"—XW091
 "Dead Man's Curve" / "Drag City"—XW092
 "Honolulu Lulu" / "Sidewalk Surfin'"—XW093
 "The Little Old Lady From Pasadena" / "Popsicle"—XW094

Collectables (CEMA Special Markets) reissues
All released 1993
 "Linda" / "The New Girl In School"—COL 6182
 "Honolulu Lulu" / "Sidewalk Surfin"—COL 6183
 "Popsicle" / "(Here They Come) From All Over The World"—COL 618

Notes

References

External links

Discographies of American artists
Rock music group discographies